Sambizanga is a 1972 film by director Sarah Maldoror. Set in 1961 at the onset of the Angolan War of Independence, it follows the struggles of Angolan militants involved with the Popular Movement for the Liberation of Angola (MPLA), an anti-colonial political movement of which Maldoror's husband, Mário Coelho Pinto de Andrade, was a leader. The film, the first feature produced by a Lusophone African country, is based on the novella A vida verdadeira de Domingos Xavier ("The Real Life of Domingos Xavier") by Angolan writer José Luandino Vieira.

Production 

The film was shot on location in the People's Republic of Congo (also known as Congo-Brazzaville) in seven weeks.

Synopsis
Sambizanga is the name of the working-class neighbourhood in Luanda where a Portuguese prison was located to which many Angolan militants were taken to be tortured and killed.  On February 4, 1961, this prison was attacked by MPLA forces.

The film begins with the arrest of Angolan revolutionary Domingos Xavier by Portuguese colonial officials. Xavier is taken to the prison in Sambizanga where he is at risk of being tortured to death for not giving the Portuguese the names of his fellow dissidents. The film follows Xavier's wife, Maria, who searches from jail to jail trying to discover what has become of her husband.

Cast
Most of the actors were non-professionals who were in some ways involved with African anti-colonial movements, such as the MPLA and the African Party for the Independence of Guinea and Cape Verde (PAIGC). The character of Domingos Xavier was played by an Angolan exile living in Congo, Domingos Oliveira and the character of Maria was played by economist Elisa Andrade from Cape Verde

According to N. Frank Ukadike, in Reclaiming Images of Women in Films from Africa and the Black Diaspora , Sambizanga "gives female subjectivity special attention, as it pertains to revolutionary struggles.... The feminist aspect of the film becomes apparent... as it is aimed at giving credibility to women's participation."

Reception
Michael Kerbel writing in The Village Voice compared Sambizanga to Soviet Russian filmmaker Sergei Eisenstein's 1925 masterpiece Battleship Potemkin in terms of its political significance. Only after the Carnation Revolution was the film able to be released in Portugal on October 19, 1974. Guardian film writer Mark Cousins included it in a 2012 list of ten best African films and called it "as bold, as well-lit as Caravaggio paintings".

Awards

 Maldoror won a Tanit d'or at the 1972 Carthage Film Festival
 She also won recognition at the 1973 Berlin International Film Festival

References

External links
 
 Podcast about Sambizanga on SOAS Radio
 Interview with Sarah Maldoror 1997 Center for the Study and Research of African Women in Cinema
 Review of Sambizanga on World Cinema Directory
 Sambizanga and Sarah Maldoror, article by Michael Dembrow

Angolan drama films
1972 films
Films set in Angola
Democratic Republic of the Congo drama films